Sylvia Raphael Schjødt (born 1 April 1937 – 9 February 2005) was a South African-born Israeli Mossad agent, convicted of murder in Norway for her involvement in the Lillehammer affair.

Background 
Sylvia Raphael was born on 1 April 1937, near Cape Town, South Africa. Raphael, whose father was a Jewish atheist and mother was Christian, was raised in her mother's religion. Having witnessed an antisemitic incident in her native country as a child, however, she immigrated to Israel in 1963. She initially lived on a kibbutz and later worked as a teacher before moving to Tel Aviv.

There she was recruited by Mossad. After training she attained the rank of “combatant,” the highest rank for a Mossad agent, which qualified Raphael to operate in foreign countries. She was sent to Paris in the guise of a freelance journalist with a Canadian passport in the name of real-life Canadian photojournalist Patricia Roxborough. 

When the Israeli government decided to track down the Black September operatives who committed the Munich massacre in Munich, West Germany, in 1972, Raphael provided valuable intelligence that led to the killing of three. She was then assigned to an Operation Wrath of God team. This was a covert operation directed by Mossad to assassinate individuals involved in the 1972 Olympics Munich massacre.

Lillehammer affair 
Raphael was part of a group of Mossad agents who mistakenly assassinated Morocco-born waiter Ahmed Bouchiki (brother of Chico Bouchikhi) in Lillehammer, Norway, on 21 July 1973, an incident which became known as the Lillehammer affair. The agents claimed to have mistaken Bouchiki for Ali Hassan Salameh, the chief organizer for Black September who had planned the Munich massacre.

Raphael was arrested shortly after the killing. On February 1, 1974, the Eidsivating Court of Appeal convicted her of planned murder (the most serious murder conviction under Norwegian law), espionage, and use of forged documents. Despite being sentenced to five-and-a-half years in prison, she was released after serving 15 months and deported from Norway as a foreign criminal in May 1975, as foreigners convicted of serious crimes are routinely deported after serving their sentences.

After her release, Raphael married her Norwegian defense attorney, Annæus Schjødt, but she was deported again after re-entering the country in 1977. Two years later she obtained a residence permit, but she left the country with her husband in 1992, settling in her native South Africa where she died in February 2005, aged 67, from cancer.

A square named after her was erected in the Israeli town of Migdal.

Documentary
In 2016, director Saxon Logan compiled a documentary movie on her life called Sylvia: Tracing Blood.

Bibliography

References

External links

Trials in Norway
People convicted of murder by Norway
South African emigrants to Israel
Israeli people convicted of murder
Israeli assassins
Israeli schoolteachers
1937 births
2005 deaths
Israeli people imprisoned abroad
South African people imprisoned abroad
People from Tel Aviv
People from Cape Town
People of the Mossad
Israeli spies
Israeli emigrants to Norway
Deaths from cancer in South Africa
Deaths from leukemia
People deported from Norway
Operation Wrath of God
South African people of Jewish descent
Women spies